Nana Bediatuo Asante is a Ghanaian administrator, lawyer and consultant. He is a member of the New Patriotic Party. He is the current Executive Secretary to the President of Ghana and the  Apagyahene of Akyem Abuakwa.

Early life and education
Married to Oluwafemi Adetola

Working life
Asante stated his legal practices with Paul Weiss Rifkind Wharton & Garrison, in New York before joining the African  Development Bank and Databank as a consultant and general counsel respectively.  In 2000, he  co-founder Faith Brothers Ltd, an  investment holding company with Mawuli Ababio in Accra. The company later acquired Citi Savings and Loans Ltd. where he served as a managing director, the  company was subsequently converted into Intercontinental Bank Ghana Limited and was acquired by Access Bank plc of Nigeria in 2019.

Political life
In January 2017 he was appointed the Executive Secretary at the Flagstaff House by President Nana Akuffo-Addo.

References

Living people
Year of birth missing (living people)